Nai-Chang Yeh (born 1961) is a Taiwanese-American physicist specializing in experimental condensed matter physics.

Early life and education 
She was born and grew up in Chiayi, Taiwan and received her B. Sc. from National Taiwan University in the capital Taipei City in 1983. She went to the US for graduate education and obtained her Ph.D. in physics in 1988 from the Massachusetts Institute of Technology.

In a personal statement on her life and career, Yeh has described her childhood intellectual and artistic curiosity leading her to excel academically. She credits her mother, a mathematics professor, and her Ph.D. supervisor Professor Mildred Dresselhaus as role models who helped to give her confidence in her ability to succeed in physics.

Career and research 
Her research emphasis is the fundamental physical properties of strongly correlated electronic systems. She is best known for her work on a variety of superconductors, magnetic materials, and superconductor/ferromagnet heterostructures. She is also interested in the physics and applications of low-dimensional electronic systems such as graphene and carbon nanotubes. She contributed to the development of a faster technique to produce high-quality graphene. Her experimental techniques include development of various cryogenic scanning probe microscopes for applications to nano-science and technology, as well as superconducting resonator technologies that have been applied to high-resolution studies of superfluid phase transitions and Bose–Einstein condensation in helium gas. She also works on exploring properties of topological insulators.

She is Professor of Physics and the Fletcher Jones Foundation Co-Director of the Kavli Nanoscience Institute at the California Institute of Technology. Yeh was the first female professor in that department when she joined in 1989. She is also part of the Caltech Institute for Quantum Information and Matter.

Awards and recognition 
She has been recognized by a number of professional associations:

Fellow, American Association for the Advancement of Science; 
Fellow, American Physical Society ; 
Fellow and Chartered Physicist, The Institute of Physics, UK; 
David and Lucile Packard Fellow for Science and Engineering;
Sloan Research Fellow

She was lauded in Time magazine on Nov. 18, 1991, as a scientific "rising star" in California.
She is cited in the American Men and Women of Science.

References

葉乃裳教授專訪 (Interview with Professor Yeh Nai-Chang) (2007-9-1), Department of Physics, National Taiwan University, 2008

External links 
California Institute of Technology faculty page
Chinese American Faculty Association 2001 Award
Yeh in nanoscience

American people of Taiwanese descent
American people of Chinese descent
American women physicists
Fellows of the American Association for the Advancement of Science
Living people
1961 births
Taiwanese women physicists
21st-century American physicists
People from Chiayi
National Taiwan University alumni
MIT Department of Physics alumni
Fellows of the American Physical Society
Sloan Research Fellows
California Institute of Technology faculty
American women academics
21st-century American women scientists